"King of Mambo" is a compilation album by Lou Bega released in 2002. It includes songs from his previous albums "A Little Bit of Mambo'" and "Ladies and Gentlemen".

Track listing
"Mambo No. 5 (A Little Bit of...)"
 "Most Expensive Girl in the World "
 "Baby Keep Smiling"
 "I Got a Girl"
 "God Is a Woman"
 "People Lovin' Me"
 "Shit Happens"
 "Can I Tico Tico You"
 "Money"
 "Mambo Mambo"
 "1+1=2"
 "Beauty on the TV-Screen"
 "Just a Gigolo / I Ain't Got Nobody"
 "Tricky, Tricky"

Credits

Composers
Spencer Williams
Frank Lio 
Leonello Casucci
Lou Bega
Peter Hoff
D. Fact
Julius Brammer
Irving Caesar
Roger Graham

References

2001 greatest hits albums
Lou Bega albums